Camaná is the district capital of the homonymous province, located in the Department of Arequipa, Peru. In 2015, it had an estimate of 39,026 inhabitants.

It lies 180 km from Arequipa, on the Panamerican Highway, which can be traveled in three hours.

History
It is where the Spanish founded "Villa Hermosa" in 1539, moving into the valley of Arequipa in 1540. The city of Arequipa had his first crib in this rich and extensive valley of Camaná.

References

External links
 INEI Census results 

Populated places in the Arequipa Region